The 1990–91 IHF Women's European Champions Cup was the 30th edition of Europe's competition for national champions women's handball clubs, running between September 1990 and April 1991. TV Giessen defeated defending champion Hypo Niederösterreich to become the third German club to win the competition after East Germany's HC Leipzig and TSC Berlin. Rostselmash and Buducnost Titograd were the last teams to represent former powerhouses Soviet Union and SFR Yugoslavia in the competition due to the collapse of both states in the following months.

Qualifying round

Round of 16

Quarter-finals

Semifinals

Final

References

Women's EHF Champions League
Ihf Women's European Cup, 1990-91
Ihf Women's European Cup, 1990-91
Eur
Eur